Marnix Vincent (1936–2016) was a Belgian literary translator, primarily translating Dutch into French.

Life
Vincent was born in Oudenaarde on December 25, 1936. He studied romance languages at the University of Ghent, and went on to teach at the Institut libre Marie Haps. In 2005, he was awarded the Flemish Community's triennial prize for the translation of Dutch literature. He died in Aalst on April 6, 2016.

Work
Authors he translated included literary giants like Hugo Claus, Willem Elsschot, and Gerard Reve, as well as writers such as Leonard Nolens, Luuk Gruwez, and Stefan Hertmans. His French translation of Vincent van Gogh's letters was published by Actes Sud in 2009.

References

1936 births
2016 deaths
Translators from Dutch
Ghent University alumni
People from Oudenaarde
20th-century translators